A lava tube, or pyroduct, is a natural conduit formed by flowing lava from a volcanic vent that moves beneath the hardened surface of a lava flow. If lava in the tube empties, it will leave a cave.

Africa

Democratic Republic of the Congo
 Unnamed cave along the Kakomeru climbing route of Mt. Nyamulagira

Ethiopia
 70 m lava tube cave has been recorded southeast of Addis Ababa and a smaller example on K'one Volcano

Kenya
 Chyulu Hills – contains nearly 100 tubes
 Elmenteita Badlands north of Mt. Eburru – several small caves
 Leviathan Cave – At 12.5 kilometres, it is the longest lava tube in Africa.
 Emuruangogolak Volcano caves
 North Chyulu hills area – 20 caves are known
 Hells Teeth
 Kimakia Caves
 Mathioni
 Skull Caves
 Kimakia Cave
 Lake Tillam, near Korosi Volcano – several known lava tubes
 Mount Suswa – around 40 known caves totaling around 11 km
 Menengai Caldera – single vent-like cave
 Nyambeni Mountains near Maua – 2 known caves

Rwanda
 Musanze System – total 5.1 km
 Ubuvomo bwa Musanze – 4.56 km
 Ubuvomo bwa Nyrabadogo – 1.5 km

Tanzania
 Mount Kilimanjaro Mawenzi lava tube system (at least 5)

Uganda
 Garama Cave – Kigesi Diestrict is 342 m long

Asia

China
 Wudalianchi National Park and Global Geopark
 Laoheishan volcano
 Fairy Palace Cave
 Waterfall Palace Cave
 East Jiaodebushan volcano
 Ice Cave
 Underground Ice River
 Jingpo Hu National Park and Global Geopark
 Weihuting Cave
 Longyandongtian Cave (Dragon Rock Cave)
 Shenshui Cave (Driven Water Cave)
 Gubingdong Cave (Ancient Ice Cave)
 Jiemei Cave (Sisters Cave)
 Kanlianmiying Cave (Anti-J Allied Army Secret Camp)
 Leiqiong Global Geopark – More than 30 tubes
 Seventy Two Cave Lava Tunnel

Japan
 Fugaku Wind Cave
 Lake Sai Bat Cave
 Narusawa Ice Cave

Saudi Arabia
 Harrat Khaybar lava field – Umm Jirsan lava tube – 1.5km (Pint 2009)

South Korea
 Geomunoreum Lava Tube System
 Gimnyeonggul
 Manjang Cave – more than 8 kilometers long, located in Jeju Island, is a popular tourism spot.

Europe

Iceland
 Búri (cave)
 Raufarhólshellir
 Surtshellir – For a long time, this was the longest known lava tube in the world.
 Víðgelmir

Italy
 Grotta del Gelo

Portugal
 Azores
 Algar do Carvão
 Furna de Água
 Furnas do Cavalum
 Galerias da Feteira
 Gruta Brisa Azul
 Gruta das Agulhas
 Gruta das Cinco Ribeiras
 Gruta das Mercês
 Gruta das Torres
 Gruta do Carvão
 Gruta do Natal
 Gruta do Zé Grande
 São Vicente Caves

Spain
 Canary Islands
 Cuevas de los Murciélagos
 Cueva de los Verdes
 Cueva del Viento
 Jameos del Agua
 Tunnel de la Atlantida
 Cueva de los Verdes

North America

United States
 Ape Cave - Washington (state)
 Bandera Volcano Ice Cave – New Mexico
 Cheese Cave – Washington (state)
 Indian Tunnel lava tube (and more than 250 other examples) in Craters of the Moon National Monument and Preserve, Idaho
 Derrick Cave – Oregon
 El Malpais National Monument, in western New Mexico.
 Hālona Blowhole
 Kaumana Cave – Hawaii
 Kuna Caves – Idaho
 Lava Beds National Monument – California
 Newberry National Volcanic Monument – Oregon
 Arnold Lava Tube System
 Boyd Cave – Oregon
 Horse Lava Tube System
 Redmond Caves
 Lava River Cave
 Lava Top Butte basalt
 Skeleton Cave
 Lava River Cave – Arizona
 Mammoth Cave – Utah
 Niter Ice Cave – Idaho
 Pluto's Cave – California
 Skylight Cave – Oregon
 Subway Cave Lava Tubes – Lassen National Forest, California
 Wilson Butte Cave – Idaho

Oceania

Australia
 Undara Volcanic National Park – Queensland

Galapagos
 Bellavista lava tunnel

New Zealand
 Auckland volcanic field Includes more than 50 lava tubes
 Wiri Lava Cave

Samoa
 Alofaaga Blowholes

Extra Terrestrial
 Lunar lava tube
 Martian lava tube

References

Lava tubes
Volcanology
Cave geology
Volcanic landforms